Gabdulkhay Khuramovich Akhatov (Russian: Габдулха́й Хура́мович Аха́тов; Volga Tatar: Габделхәй Хурам улы Əхәтов; September 8, 1927 – November 25, 1986) was a Soviet Tatar Linguist, Turkologist and an organizer of science (earning his first Ph.D in 1954) and then a second doctorate of Philology in 1965. Professor (1970).

Akhatov graduated with honors from Kazan State Pedagogical Institute in 1951 and later from graduate school in 1954. He became a member of the Higher Attestation Commission of the Council of Ministers of the USSR and was also chairman of the specialized boards for doctoral and master's theses in a number of universities across the now-defunct USSR.

Akhatov was the founder of a number of research institutions, including the modern scientific school of Tatar dialectological and the phraseological Kazan school.

Although Gabdulkhay Akhatov was a Volga Tatar, he immersed into studying of the phonetic peculiarities of Siberian Tatar language of the indigenous population of Siberia, the Siberian Tatars. In his classic fundamental research work "The Dialect of the West Siberian Tatars" (1963)  Akhatov wrote about Tobol-Irtysh Siberian Tatars, a western group of Siberian Tatars, who are indigenous to the Omsk and Tyumen Oblasts.

After a comprehensive integrated analysis of the phonetic system, the lexical composition and the grammatical structure, the scientist concluded that the language of the Siberian Tatars was a separate language from the beginning, and it is one of the most ancient Turkic languages. He put the dialects of the Siberian Tatar language into two categories; one of Baraba and Tom Tatars which he named dialects of Eastern Siberian Tatars, while dialects of Tyumen and Omsk Oblasts he named dialects of Western Siberian Tatars.

By studying the phonetic peculiarities of the dialect of the local population of Siberia, Professor G.Akhatov first among the scientists discovered in the Speech of Siberian Tatars is such a thing as 'clip-clop', which in his opinion, was obtained for the Siberian Tatars of Kipchaks.

Akhatov, for the first time in Turkic studies, gave a theoretically consistent and systematic description of the idiomatic expressions of the Volga Tatar language. He is the author of the widely known book - "Phraseological Dictionary of the Tatar Language" (1982).

For more than 30 years, Professor Akhatov headed the department of Tatar philology at various universities and institutes in Russia.

Akhatov also did research on the general theory of language. He  published a fundamental work on the main sign of paired words, explored and thoroughly investigated the nature of the double negative in the Turkic languages, and also discovered and formulated the law of pairing in Turkic languages.

Akhatov trained over 40 doctors and candidates of sciences, and published about 200 scientific papers.

He was a true polyglot. He knew more than two dozen languages.

A number of his scientific works were highly praised at the XIII International Congress of Linguists (ICL) (Tokyo, 1982).
Akhatov organized and led several dialectological expeditions and was the author of fundamental scientific works, dictionaries, textbooks, manuals and programs for dialectology, phraseology, and lexicology.

He was a recipient of the Medal "For Labour Valour" and the Medal "Veteran of Labour".

His son Aydar Akhatov (born 20 June 1957) is a Russian state, political and public figure, Economist, a second doctorate in Economics, Ecologist and Lawyer

Major works 
Akhatov G. Phraseological Expressions in Tatar Language. Kazan: KSU Publishing House, 1960.
Akhatov G. Issues of Teaching Methods of the Tatar Language in the Eastern Dialect" (Monograph). Tobolsk, 1958.
Akhatov G. The Language of the Siberian Tatars. Phonetic Features "(Monograph). Ufa, 1960.
Akhatov G. About the Ethnogenesis of the Western Siberian Tatars.- Sat. 'Questions Dialectology Turkic Languages', Kazan, 1960.
Akhatov G. About the Accent in the Language of the Siberian Tatars in Connection with the Accent of Modern Tatar Literary Language" .- Sat 'Problems of Turkic and the History of Russian Oriental Studies.' Kazan, 1960.  
Akhatov G. Some Features of the Teaching of the Mother Tongue in the Conditions of the Eastern Dialect of the Tatar Language.- Sat 'Questions dialectology Turkic languages'. Kazan, 1960. 
Akhatov G. About Peculiarities of Idiomatic Expression. - J. 'Soviet school'. Kazan, 1960.(Tatar Language)
Akhatov G. Dialect of the Western Siberian Tatars (Monograph). Ufa, 1963. 
Akhatov G. Local Dialects are Reliable Source for Comparative and Historical Study of Languages." - Sat. 'Questions Dialectology of the Turkic Languages.' Baku, 1963. 
Akhatov G. Lexical and Phraseological Peculiarities of the Eastern Dialect of the Tatar Language. - Sat. 'Proceedings of Universities of the Ural Economic District. Linguistics.' - Sverdlovsk, 1963.
Akhatov G. About the Accent in the Language of the Siberian Tatars. - Sat. 'Problems of Turkic and Oriental History." Kazan: KSU Publishing House, 1964.
Akhatov G. Dialects of the Western Siberian Tatars. Diss. for DSc in Philologist. of Sciences. Tashkent, 1965.
Akhatov G. Language Сontacts of Peoples of the Volga and Ural (Monograph). Ufa, 1970.
Akhatov G. Phraseology (Monograph). Ufa, 1972.
Akhatov G. The Modern Tatar Language (a Program for University Students). Kazan: Publishing House of Kazan State Pedagogical Institute. 1974. 
Akhatov G. The Vocabulary of Modern Tatar Language" (a Textbook for University Students). Ufa, 1975.
Akhatov G. Tatar Phraseology (a Program for University Students). Ufa: BSU Publishing House, 1975.
Akhatov G. Dialect of the Western Siberian Tatars in the Relation to the Literary Language. Ufa: BSU Publishing House, 1975.
Akhatov G. The Use of Dialectal Data for Comparative History Study of the Turkic Languages.– Sat. ' Soviet Turkology and Development of Turkic Languages in the USSR'. Alma-Ata, 1976.
Akhatov G. Tatar Dialectology. Dialect of the Western Siberian Tatars "(Textbook for University Students). Ufa, 1977.
Akhatov G. Polysemous Words in the Tatar Language (a Program Elective Course for University Students). Ufa, BSU Publishing House, 1977.
Akhatov G. Tatar Dialectology. Average Dialect (Textbook for University Students). Ufa, 1979.
Akhatov G. About the Drafting of the Tatar Language Phrasebook (Monograph). Ufa, 1979.
Akhatov G. Arsk Subdialect of Kazan Dialect of the Tatar Language.- Sat. of Chuvash State University named Ulyanov, Cheboksary, 1979.
Akhatov G. Lexicology of modern Tatar Literary Language (Monograph). Kazan, 1979.
Akhatov G. Mishar Dialect of Tatar Language" (a Textbook for University Students). Ufa, 1980.
Akhatov G. Sources of the Construction of Historical Dialectology of the Tatar Language. - Sat. 'Linguistic Geography and History of the Language Problem'. Nalchik, 1981.
Akhatov G. Menzelinsk Subdialect of the Tatar Language.- Sat. of Chuvash State University named Ulyanov, Cheboksary, 1979.
Akhatov G. About Basic Features of Paired Words. - J. "The Soviet Finno-Ugric." Talin, 1981, № 2.
Akhatov G. Dialects and Toponymy of the Volga Region (Interuniversity Collection).- Sat. of Chuvash State University named Ulyanov, Cheboksary, 1981.
Akhatov G. Phraseological Dictionary of the Tatar Language" (Monograph). Kazan, 1982. 
Akhatov G. The Modern Tatar Literary Language" (Monograph). Kazan, 1982.(Tatar Language)
Akhatov G. Antonyms and Principles of the First in the Tatar Language Dictionary of Antonyms" (Monograph). Ufa, 1982.
Akhatov G. Tatar Dialectology (Textbook for University Students), Kazan, 1984. (Tatar Language)
Akhatov G. About the Nature of the Double Negative in the Turkic Languages of Kipchak-Bulgar Subgroup. - J. 'Soviet Turkology'. 1984, № 3.
Akhatov G. Winged Words. – J. 'Yalkyn'. Kazan, 1985, № 11.(Tatar Language)
Akhatov G. About the Law of the Pairing of Words in Turkic Languages / Sat. 'Turcologica'. - Moscow, 1987.
Achatow G. Unsere vielsprachige Welt / NL, Berlin, 1986, № 4.(German)
Achatow G. Linguistik im Bund mit Computer / NL, Berlin, 1986, № 24.(German)
Akhatov G. Vocabulary of the Tatar Language (Textbook for Students of Universities and Colleges). Kazan, 1995.(Tatar Language)

References

External links 

The scientific heritage of Professor Gabdulkhay Akhatov 
British Library : Works by Professor G. Kh. Akhatov 
 
Work by Professor G. Аkhatov in University of Michigan (U.S.A.) 
Professor Gabdulkhay Akhatov is the famous Russian scientist  
VIAF / Works by Professor G. Kh. Akhatov : 114024654/
WorldCat / Works by Professor G. Kh. Akhatov : 

1927 births
1986 deaths
People from Aktanyshsky District
Volga Tatar people
Tatar people of the Soviet Union
Soviet philologists
Linguists from the Soviet Union
Linguists of Turkic languages
20th-century philologists
20th-century linguists